Bramante is a crater on Mercury. It has a diameter of 156 kilometers. Its name was adopted by the International Astronomical Union in 1976. Bramante is named for the Italian architect Donato Bramante, who lived from 1444 to 1514.

A single bright patch of hollows is present in the northwestern part of the crater.

References

Donato Bramante
Impact craters on Mercury